The city of Mumbai (formerly Bombay) has witnessed several riots during its history. These are the list of riots.

Riots

See also

List of massacres in India

References

Riots
Riots
Mumbai
Riots in Mumbai